Yên Thịnh may refer to several places in Vietnam, including:

Yên Thịnh, Yên Bái, a ward of Yên Bái
Yên Thịnh, Ninh Bình, a township and capital of Yên Mô District
Yên Thịnh, Bắc Kạn, a commune of Chợ Đồn District
Yên Thịnh, Lạng Sơn, a commune of Hữu Lũng District
Yên Thịnh, Thanh Hoá, a commune of Yên Định District